In Violet Light is the eighth full-length album by Canadian rock band The Tragically Hip. The album debuted at #2 on the Canadian Albums Chart, selling almost 33,000 copies in its first week. The album  has been certified platinum in Canada.

Packaged with the album in stores was a membership card for The Hip Club, an online fan club which offered three digital bonus tracks, "Forest Edge", "Problem Bears" and "Ultra Mundane".

The music video for "It's a Good Life, If You Don't Weaken" was filmed in Oshawa, Ontario, at Parkwood Estate. The light-hearted music video for "The Darkest One" featured Don Cherry and the Trailer Park Boys.

The song "Throwing Off Glass" was also released on the Men with Brooms soundtrack album.

At the Juno Awards of 2021, in the band's first live performance as a unit since Gord Downie's death in 2017, the band performed "It's a Good Life If You Don't Weaken" with Feist on vocals.

Track listing
All songs were written by The Tragically Hip.

The Tragically Hip
Gord Downie – lead vocals
Rob Baker – lead guitar
Paul Langlois – rhythm guitar
Gord Sinclair – bass guitar, backing vocals
Johnny Fay – drums

Year-end charts

References

2002 albums
The Tragically Hip albums
Albums produced by Hugh Padgham
Universal Records albums